World Clique is the debut album by American dance music band Deee-Lite, which was released in 1990. The album's first single, "Groove Is in the Heart", was a top-five success on both the U.S. Billboard Hot 100 and UK Singles Chart as well as a No. 1 hit on the U.S. Hot Dance Club Play chart. Three subsequent singles also hit the top ten on the U.S. dance chart, including "Power of Love/Build That Bridge", which also hit No. 1, and "Good Beat".

Guest artists on the album include Bootsy Collins, Q-Tip, Fred Wesley and Maceo Parker. When World Clique was released on compact disc, two bonus tracks were added to the album: "Deee-Lite Theme" and "Build the Bridge".

"E.S.P." contains a sample of actor Bela Lugosi from the 1934 film The Black Cat.

Critical reception

Robert Hilburn of the Los Angeles Times called World Clique "seductive and smart", while Billboard called it an "innovative, media-saturated debut".

In 2003, Slant Magazine included World Clique in its list, Vital Pop: 50 Essential Pop Albums. Charles Pitter for Zouch notes that album track and single "Groove Is in the Heart" is a "dance classic".

Commercial performance
The album's initial success occurred in the UK, where it peaked at No. 14 on the UK Albums Chart in September 1990. Simultaneously, the album entered the Billboard 200 at No. 180 for the week of September 15 in the US. Fueled by the success of "Groove Is in the Heart", World Clique continued to climb the chart for several weeks, peaking at No. 20 for the week of November 24.

The success of subsequent singles "Power of Love", "Good Beat", and "E.S.P." helped the album to sustain steady sales throughout the following months, with the album achieving RIAA Gold certification in December 1990 and remaining on the Billboard 200 for a total of 41 weeks before falling off the chart in June 1991, following its final chart position at No. 199.
World Clique is Deee-Lite's most successful album, outlasting Infinity Within (1992) and Dewdrops in the Garden (1994) on the Billboard 200 chart and outperforming its successors in terms of highest peak position and mainstream exposure and sales.

Track listing

Personnel

Deee-Lite
Super DJ Dimitry
Jungle DJ Towa Towa
The Lady Miss Kier Kirby

Additional personnel
Bootsy Collins – additional bass ("Who Was That?"), additional guitar ("Smile On"), guitar ("Try Me"), background vocals ("Groove Is in the Heart")
Q-Tip (from A Tribe Called Quest) – rap ("Groove Is in the Heart")
Sahirah – background vocals ("World Clique")
Sheila Slappy – background vocals ("World Clique")
Fred Wesley – trombone ("Smile On", "Groove Is in the Heart", "Try Me On")
Maceo Parker – saxophone ("Smile On", "Groove Is in the Heart", "Try Me On")
Bill "Chicken on Fire" Coleman – vocals ("Build the Bridge")

Technical
Deee-Lite – producer, arranger, mixing
Mike "Tweekin" Rogers – additional background vocal production and arrangement, engineer, mixing
Eddie Sancho – assistant engineer
Derek Lategan – assistant engineer
Bob Power – additional engineering
Herb Powers – mastering
Bill Coleman – executive producer
Nick Egan – art direction, design
Daisy – art direction
Tom Bouman – design
Michael Halsband – photography
Michael Economy – comics
Tabboo!! – hand lettering

Charts

Weekly charts

Year-end charts

Certifications

References

Deee-Lite albums
1990 debut albums
Elektra Records albums